Wally A. Forsberg (February 15, 1909 – April 5, 1999) was an American football and basketball coach.

Coaching career

Ottawa
Forsberg was the 15th head football coach at the Ottawa University in Ottawa, Kansas and he held that position for three seasons, from 1946 until 1948.  His career coaching record at Ottawa was 20–6–2.  Forsberg also coached basketball at the school during his tenure.

Kansas Wesleyan
Forsberg next traveled to Salina, Kansas to become the 12th head football coach at Kansas Wesleyan University.  Forsberg held that position for three seasons, from 1949 until 1951.  His coaching record at Kansas Wesleyan was 11–16–1.

Head coaching record

Football

References

1909 births
1999 deaths
Kansas Wesleyan Coyotes football coaches
Kansas Wesleyan Coyotes men's basketball coaches
Ottawa Braves basketball coaches
Ottawa Braves football coaches